Avishek Das (born 5 September 2001) is a Bangladeshi cricketer. He made his List A debut on 15 March 2020, for Old DOHS Sports Club, in the 2019–20 Dhaka Premier Division Cricket League. Prior to his List A debut, he was named in Bangladesh's squad for the 2020 Under-19 Cricket World Cup.

References

External links
 

2001 births
Living people
Bangladeshi cricketers
Old DOHS Sports Club cricketers
Place of birth missing (living people)